Ewa Paradies (17 December 1920 – 4 July 1946) was a Nazi concentration camp overseer.

In August 1944, Paradies arrived at the Stutthof SK-III camp for training as an Aufseherin, or overseer. She soon finished training and became a wardress. In October 1944, she was reassigned to Stutthof's Bromberg-Ost subcamp, and in January 1945, back to the main Stutthof camp. 

In April 1945, Paradies accompanied one of the last transports of women prisoners to the Lauenburg subcamp and fled. After she was captured, she was a defendant in the Stutthof trial. One witness testified:She ordered a group of female prisoners to undress in the freezing cold of winter, and then doused them with ice cold water. When the women moved, Paradies beat them.

Execution 

For this and other brutalities, including causing the deaths of some prisoners , Paradies was sentenced to death. She was publicly executed by short-drop hanging on 4 July 1946 with 10 other Stutthof guards and kapos (five women and six men in all); Paradies was the last of the women to hang.

See also 

 Female guards in Nazi concentration camps

References

Sources 
 Daniel Patrick Brown. The Female Auxiliaries Who Assisted the SS in Running the Nazi Concentration Camp System. Atglen, Pennsylvania: Schiffer Publishing, Ltd., 2002. p. 288; 
 Jack G. Morrison: Ravensbrück: Everyday Life in a Women's Concentration Camp 1939–45. Markus Wiener Publishers, 2000. p. 380; 
 Rochelle G. Saidel: The Jewish Women of Ravensbrück Concentration Camp. University of Wisconsin Press, 2004. p. 336;

External links 

ExecutedToday.com 1946: Eleven from the Stutthof concentration camp
Death on the gallows (many photos)

1920 births
1946 deaths
Executed German women
People from Lębork
People from the Province of Pomerania
Stutthof trials executions
Executed people from Pomeranian Voivodeship
Female guards in Nazi concentration camps
Filmed executions
Publicly executed people

People executed for crimes against humanity